Dmitry Ivanovich Litvinov (– 5 July 1929) was a Russian botanist responsible for the naming of a large variety of East European and Asian plants. He is known as the author of the concept of glacial refugia for the plants growing on chalk and limestone slopes of the banks of rivers in the European part of Russia. Together with Vasily Zinger, he discovered the natural monument Galichya Gora in Central Russia (river Don) inhabited by relict plants.

He graduated from the Imperial Moscow Technical School in 1879, receiving the degree of a construction mechanic specialist. Interested in botany, in 1898 he quit his job as a teacher at a technical school and became a curator and later a senior botanist at the Botanical Museum of the Academy of Sciences, where he worked until the end of his life.

Alternative spelling of the names: Dimitri Ivanovitch Litvinov (in French); Dmitrij Iwanowitsch Litwinow (in German).

References
 biogeographers.dvo.ru - Litvinov Dmitry Ivanovich (1854-1929) 

19th-century botanists from the Russian Empire
1855 births
1929 deaths
20th-century Russian botanists